The  Emmelichthyidae are a family of small to medium-sized marine fish known commonly as rovers. The family was once much larger, including a wide range of plankton-eating fish, but most of the genera were discovered to be unrelated examples of parallel evolution, and were moved to other families.

The rovers are distributed in tropical and warmer temperate waters in the Indo-Pacific, southern Pacific, eastern Atlantic, and Caribbean Sea.

These fish have protrusible, toothless or nearly toothless jaws, long dorsal fins, and forked tail fins with lobes that fold in like scissors. The largest species reach about 50 centimeters in length.

See also
 List of fish families

References 

 
Perciformes families
Marine fish families
Taxa named by David Starr Jordan